The Gruber Prize in Genetics, established in 2001, is one of three international awards worth US$500,000 made by the Gruber Foundation, a non-profit organization based at Yale University in New Haven, Connecticut.

The Genetics Prize honors leading scientists for distinguished contributions in any realm of genetics research. The Foundation’s other international prizes are in Cosmology, Neuroscience, Justice, and Women’s Rights.

Recipients
2023 Allan Jacobson (University of Massachusetts Chan Medical School), and Lynne E. Maquat (University of Rochester School of Medicine)
2022 Ruth Lehmann (Whitehead Institute and MIT), James Priess (Fred Hutchinson Cancer Research Center), and Geraldine Seydoux (Johns Hopkins University School of Medicine).
2021 Stuart H. Orkin (Harvard Medical School, Howard Hughes Medical Institute)
2020 Bonnie Bassler (Princeton University, Howard Hughes Medical Institute)
2019 Bert Vogelstein (Johns Hopkins Hospital, Howard Hughes Medical Institute)
2018 Joanne Chory (Salk Institute for Biological Studies), and Elliot Meyerowitz (Caltech)
2017 Stephen J. Elledge, Harvard Medical School
2016 Michael Grunstein, University of California, Los Angeles (UCLA) and C. David Allis, Rockefeller Foundation
2015 Emmanuelle Charpentier, Helmholtz Centre for Infection Research in Germany and Jennifer Doudna, University of California, Berkeley
2014 Victor Ambros, PhD, University of Massachusetts; David Baulcombe, PhD, University of Cambridge; and Gary Ruvkun, PhD, Harvard University
2013 Svante Pääbo, PhD
2012 Douglas C. Wallace, PhD
2011 Ronald W. Davis, PhD, Stanford University
2010 Gerald Fink, PhD, the Margaret and Herman Sokol Professor at MIT
2009 Janet Rowley, MD, the Blum-Riese Distinguished Service Professor at the University of Chicago
2008 Allan C. Spradling, PhD, of the Carnegie Institution for Science and Howard Hughes Medical Institute (HHMI) in Baltimore; for his work on fruit fly genomics 
2007 Maynard Olson of the University of Washington, a bioinformatics specialist
2006 Elizabeth Blackburn, a cell biologist specializing in telomeres 
2005 Robert Hugh Waterston
2004 Mary Claire King
2003 David Botstein
2002 H. Robert Horvitz
2001 Rudolf Jaenisch

See also

 List of genetics awards

References

External links
 Gruber Foundation Web site
 Gruber Prizes nomination page
 Facebook page for The Peter and Patricia Gruber Foundation

American science and technology awards
Awards established in 2001
Genetics awards